Coching Chu (March 7, 1890 – February 7, 1974) was a Chinese geologist and meteorologist.

Born in Shangyu, Zhejiang, Chu went to United States for his college education in 1910. He graduated from the College of Agriculture, University of Illinois in 1913. In 1918, he received his Ph.D. in meteorology from Harvard University.

From 1920 to 1929, he was chairperson of Department of Meteorology, Nanjing University (formerly known as the Nanking Higher Normal School, National Southeastern University, and National Central University).

From 1929 to 1936 he served as director of the Chinese Institute of Meteorology of the Academia Sinica, which at the time was located in mainland China. Academia Sinica later became the predecessor of the Chinese Academy of Sciences of the People's Republic of China on mainland China and the Academia Sinica of the Republic of China on Taiwan.

From 1936 to 1949, he served as the president of National Chekiang University (now known as Zhejiang University) and elevated the institution to one of the most prestigious universities in China.  During that time, he sent manuscripts relating to the history of Chinese science to Joseph Needham in England.

On October 16, 1949, he was assigned to the position of vice president of the Chinese Academy of Sciences.

In 1955, he was elected an academician of the Chinese Academy of Sciences.

Academic papers 
Some Chinese Contributions to Meteorology Geographical Review: Vol. 5, No. 2. (Feb., 1918), pp. 136–139.
A New Classification of Typhoons of the Far East Monthly Weather Review: Vol. 52, No. 12. (Dec., 1924), pp. 570–579.
The Place of Origin and Recurvature of Typhoons Monthly Weather Review: Vol. 53, No. 1 (Jan., 1925), pp. 1–5.
The Complete Works of Coching Chu Shanghai Scientific & Technological Education Publishing House

Further reading 
 

1890 births
1974 deaths
Boxer Indemnity Scholarship recipients
20th-century Chinese geologists
Chinese meteorologists
Educators from Shaoxing
Fudan University alumni
Harvard Graduate School of Arts and Sciences alumni
Members of Academia Sinica
Members of the Chinese Academy of Sciences
Academic staff of Nanjing University
Academic staff of the National Central University
People from Shangyu
Presidents of Zhejiang University
Scientists from Shaoxing
University of Illinois College of Agriculture, Consumer, and Environmental Sciences alumni
Academic staff of Wuhan University
Academic staff of Zhejiang University